Stigmella taeniola is a moth of the family Nepticulidae. It is found in Utah and Idaho in the United States.

The wingspan is about 5.2 mm.

The larvae feed on Amelanchier alnifolia. They mine the leaves of their host plant. The mine begins as a short, contorted linear mine which enlarges into a funnel and then a large blotch. The frass is deposited centrally in all regions of the mine and is densely packed.

External links
A taxonomic revision of the North American species of Stigmella (Lepidoptera: Nepticulidae)

Nepticulidae
Moths of North America
Moths described in 1925